Lazar Lipman Hurwitz (1815 – 21 October 1852) was a Russian Jewish editor and writer.

Biography
Hurwitz was born in 1815, the grandson of Rabbi Moses ben Isaac ha-Levi Hurwitz of Krozh. He acted for many years as private instructor at Vilna, and then became teacher in a public school at Riga. Later he was appointed by the government headmaster in the rabbinical school of Vilna.

With S. J. Fuenn, Hurwitz issued a periodical entitled Pirḥe tsafon, devoted to Jewish history, literature, and exegesis; the first number appeared in 1841, the second in 1844. He was also the author of Ḥaḳirot 'al Sefer Iyyob, studies on Job, published in the second volume of Jost's Tsiyyon (1842), and Korot toledot melekhet ha-shir veha-melitsah, a history of ancient Jewish poetry, published in Pirḥe tsafon.

References
 

1815 births
1852 deaths
19th-century Lithuanian Jews
Hebrew-language writers
Jewish writers from the Russian Empire
People from Vilna Governorate
People of the Haskalah